This is a list of area codes in California with service territory and installation dates.

209 – Stockton, Modesto, Merced, Turlock; the northern San Joaquin Valley and the central Sierra Nevada range. (Split from 415 on October 26, 1957; split off 559 on November 14, 1998; overlaid with 350 on November 28, 2022)
213 – Much of the City of Los Angeles and several inner suburbs (October 1947; split numerous times since then, including a split to form code 323 on June 13, 1998; in August 2017, the boundary between 213 and 323 was erased to form an overlay)
279 – overlay with 916, started service on March 10, 2018.
310 – The western and southwestern parts of Los Angeles County, including the Westside and South Bay regions. These include the cities and towns of Santa Monica, Malibu, Pacific Palisades, Compton, Torrance, Beverly Hills and Catalina Island. (Split from 213 on November 2, 1991; overlaid by 424 on August 26, 2006)
323 – Much of the City of Los Angeles and several inner suburbs (originally split off from 213 to form a ring around downtown Los Angeles and the city of Montebello on June 13, 1998; in August 2017, the boundary between 213 and 323 was erased to form an overlay)
341 – overlay with 510, started service on July 22, 2019.
350 - overlay with 209, started service on November 28, 2022.
408 – San Jose, Sunnyvale, Gilroy, Morgan Hill, and Los Gatos; most of Santa Clara County. (Split from 415 on January 1, 1959; overlaid by 669 on November 20, 2012)
415 – San Francisco, San Rafael, Novato; all of San Francisco County, most of Marin County and a small portion of northern San Mateo County (October 1947; split numerous times since then; overlaid by 628 effective March 21, 2015)
424 – overlay with 310, started service on August 26, 2006.
442 – overlay with 760, started service on October 24, 2009.
510 – Oakland, Fremont, Hayward, Berkeley and Richmond; western Alameda and Contra Costa Counties. (Split from 415 on September 2, 1991; overlaid by 341 on July 22, 2019)
530 – Redding, Chico, Davis, Marysville, Red Bluff, Oroville, Placerville, Truckee, Yuba City; northeastern California including most of the Sacramento Valley, the northern Sierra Nevada and the Lake Tahoe region. (Split from 916 on November 1, 1997)
559 – Fresno, Visalia, Madera, Hanford; the central San Joaquin Valley and the southern Sierra Nevada range. (Split from 209 on November 14, 1998)
(Split from 310 on January 25, 1997)
619 – City of San Diego and suburbs; created by a split from 714 on November 5, 1982; split off 760 on March 22, 1997, and 858 on June 12, 1999; re-merged with 858 in June 2018 to create the 619/858 overlay
626 – Most of the San Gabriel Valley including Pasadena, El Monte, West Covina. (Split from 818 on June 14, 1997)
628 – Overlay with 415, started service on March 21, 2015
650 – San Mateo, Palo Alto, Redwood City, Daly City; most of San Mateo County and northwestern Santa Clara County (i.e., the San Francisco Peninsula with the exception of the city and county of San Francisco). (Split from 415 on August 2, 1997)
657 – Overlay with 714, started service on September 23, 2008
661 – Most of Kern County including Bakersfield; northern Los Angeles County including Lancaster, Palmdale, and Santa Clarita. (Split from 805 on February 13, 1999)
669 – Overlay with 408, started service on November 20, 2012
707 – Santa Rosa, Eureka, Sebastopol, Petaluma, Napa, Vallejo, Fairfield; northwestern California, including the northern Bay Area, the Redwood Empire and the Wine Country. (Split from 916 on March 1, 1959)
714 – Anaheim, Huntington Beach, Santa Ana, Orange, Westminster, Garden Grove, etc.; northern and western Orange County (Split from 213 in 1951 and split numerous times since then; overlaid by 657 on September 23, 2008)
747 – Overlay with 818, started service on May 18, 2009
760 – Palm Springs, Oceanside, Bishop, Ridgecrest, Barstow, El Centro, Needles, Victorville; northern San Diego County, eastern Riverside and San Bernardino Counties (including much of the Mojave Desert), and the Owens Valley. (Split from 619 on March 22, 1997; overlaid by 442 on October 24, 2009)
805 – Santa Barbara, San Luis Obispo, Ventura, Oxnard, Santa Maria, Santa Paula; southwest Central Coast, including San Luis Obispo, Santa Barbara and Ventura counties. (Split from 213 on January 1, 1957; split off 661 on February 13, 1999; overlaid with 820 on July 2, 2018.)
818 – The San Fernando Valley of Los Angeles County: Burbank, Van Nuys, Glendale, Chatsworth, San Fernando, Panorama City and Northridge. (Split from 213 on January 7, 1984; split off 626 on June 14, 1997; overlaid by 747 on May 18, 2009)
820 – Overlay with 805, started service on July 2, 2018
831 –  Monterey, Santa Cruz, Salinas, and Hollister; the northern Central Coast. (Split from 408 on July 11, 1998)
840 – Overlay of 909 effective February 23, 2021
858 – City of San Diego and suburbs; originally created by a split from 619 on June 12, 1999; however, re-merged with 619 to create the 619/858 overlay in June 2018
909 – San Bernardino, Ontario, Pomona, and Chino; eastern Los Angeles County and southwestern San Bernardino County. (Split from 714 on November 14, 1992; split off 951 on July 17, 2004; overlaid with 840 effective February 23, 2021.)
916 – Sacramento and most of the Sacramento metro: Folsom, Roseville; Sacramento County and southern Placer County (October 1947; overlaid with 279 on March 10, 2018)
925 – Concord, Walnut Creek, Livermore, Pleasanton,  San Ramon, Martinez, and Antioch; eastern Alameda and Contra Costa Counties. (Split from 510 on March 14, 1998)
949 – Irvine, Laguna Beach, Newport Beach, San Juan Capistrano, San Clemente; southern and eastern Orange County. (Split from 714 on April 18, 1998)
951 – Riverside, Corona, Moreno Valley, Perris,  Temecula, Murrieta; western Riverside County. (Split from 909 on July 17, 2004)

See also
List of NANP area codes
North American Numbering Plan

Notes
Exchange boundaries do not follow city or county boundaries; many of the area codes include or exclude parts of cities or counties listed above. For example, the boundary between area codes 562 and 714 generally follows the boundary between Los Angeles and Orange Counties, but portions of Los Angeles County are in 714 and portions of Orange County are in 562. Similarly, most of Daly City is in 650, but a small portion is in 415.

References

External links

 All Area Codes in California

California
Area codes